John Christie is a visual artist and broadcast film-maker. As a maker of artists’ books since 1975, he has produced more than 20 limited editions for both the renowned Circle Press and his own imprint Objectif. He co-authored, with John Berger, the award-winning book I Send You This Cadmium Red. His prints, drawings and artists’ books are in many collections worldwide including the Tate Gallery, the V&A, the Yale Center for British Art, New Haven, New York Public Library and the National Library of Australia.

As a director/cameraman his art-related TV programmes include Another Way of Telling, a BBC series on photography made in collaboration with John Berger and Jean Mohr; Salvage of Soho Photographer, a C4 documentary on John Deakin; and First Hand, a series of seven films based on literary manuscripts from the British Library. As a lighting cameraman he filmed Ian Breakwell's Continuous Diary (C4), 40 Years of Modern Art (Tate), Ian Breakwell's Public Face/Private Eye (C4), David Mach - From Hill to Castle (BBC2), "David Nash - At the Edge of the Forest (BBC Wales), and The Other Side Ian Breakwell's installation produced by Anna Ridley and shown at the De La Warr Pavilion and Tate Britain.

John Christie is one of the four founding members of the award-winning East Anglian publisher Full Circle Editions and also of the FlipSide literary and music festival held at the Aldeburgh Music complex, Snape Maltings, every autumn.

Collections
[[File:Overlappings pastel on paper 2012.jpg|thumbnail|'Overlappings 2 pastel on paper 2012]]Selected Public and Library Collections - Artists Books, Prints, and Drawings Britain- Tate Gallery (books/prints); Victoria and Albert Museum (b/p); Government Art Collection (drawings); British Library (books); London College of Printing (b); Central St. Martins School of Art Library (b); Chelsea School of Art Library (b); Manchester University Library (b); Wimbledon School of Art Library (b); Winchester School of Art Library (b)
 Holland- Museum Meermanno, The Hague (books); Van Abbe Museum, Eindhoven (b)
 Australia - National Library of Australia (books/prints); Art Gallery of New South Wales (b); Sydney University Library (b); Deakin University, Victoria (b); Brisbane University (b)
 North America - Yale Center for British Art (books/prints); National Gallery of Art, Washington (b); Princeton University Library (b/p); University of Maryland (b/p); The Sackner Archive of Visual and Concrete Poetry, Miami (b/p/d); Museum of Modern Art, New York (books); New York Public Library (b); The Library of Congress (b); Getty Center Library (b); The Bridwell Library (b); Houston University (b); San Francisco Public Library (b); Walker Arts Centre, Minneapolis (b); Columbia University Library (b) Louisiana State University Library (b) John Flaxman Library, The Art Institute of Chicago (b) Green Library, Stanford University, California (b) Richard M. Ross Art Museum, Ohio Wesleyan University (p) Tang Museum, Saratoga Springs (prints)
 Canada- McGill University, Toronto (books); Thomas Fuller Library, Toronto (b)

Films
[[File:Red v Bue and Green pastel on paper 2013.jpg|thumbnail|'Red v Blue and Green''' pastel 2013]]
[[File:Too Blue pastel on paper 2015.jpg|thumbnail|360px|'Two Blue pastel on paper 2015]]
as Lighting Cameraman/Producer/Director
 1983- Ian Breakwell's Continuous Diary, Channel 4, Lighting Cameraman
 1985- A Flow of Life - Leonard McComb RA, Arts Council, Lighting Cameraman/Producer 
 1986- 40 Years of Modern Art - Tate Gallery, Annalogue, Lighting Cameraman/Producer 
 1986- Painting With Light - David Hockney, BBC 2, Lighting Cameraman 
 1986- Taking a Line on Colour - Brian Fielding, Annalogue, Lighting Cameraman/Producer
 1987- Iron Horses - Kevin Atherton, Annalogue, Lighting Cameraman 
 1987- Public Face/Private Eye - Ian Breakwell, Channel 4, Lighting Cameraman
 1988- Another Way of Telling - John Berger and Jean Mohr, BBC 2, Director - four-part series
 1990- The New British Library - British Library, Director 
 1990- TV Pieces - Artist's Video Works, Channel 4, Lighting Cameraman
 1991- Salvage of a Soho Photographer - John Deakin, Channel 4, Director
 1993- From Hill to Castle - David Mach, BBC 2, Lighting Cameraman 
 1993- At the Edge of the Forest - David Nash, BBC Wales, Lighting Cameraman
 1999- First Hand - British Literary Manuscripts, Channel 4, Director
 2002- Cadmium Red - short film, Director 
 2002- The Other Side - Ian Breakwell Installation at Tate Britain & De La Warr Pavilion, Annalogue, Lighting Cameraman

Other publications
 1990- Seeing in the Dark - A Compendium of Cinemagoing - contributor to an anthology of experiences in the cinema (Serpent's Tail) 
 1994- Brought to Book - contributor to an anthology of stories concerning books and reading (Penguin Books) 
 1995- Co-producer with Bill Furlong, Audio Arts Supplement - John Berger reading Pages of the Wound
 1996- Co-designer of the Bloomsbury paperback edition of Pages of the Wound 
 1997- Tate Magazine (issue 11) Steps Towards a Small Theory of the Visible - a text and image collaboration with John Berger 
 1999- Tate magazine (issue 19) Corresponding Colours - six page feature on Cadmium Red 
 2000- I Send You This Cadmium Red published by ACTAR, Barcelona
 2000- Red Letter Days - The Independent on Sunday, four page feature on Cadmium Red
 2000- Cadmium Red nominated by The New York Times as one of the ten best art books of the year 
 2001- Cadmium Red awarded first prize for graphic design (Premis Laus) by ADGFAD, Barcelona 
 2002- I Send You This Cadmium Red - Between the Ears, BBC Radio 3 feature with music by Gavin Bryars 
 2010- I Send You This Cadmium Red & The Island Chapel - CD with music by Gavin Bryars (BCGBCD05) 
 2011/14- I Send You This Cadmium Red - stage performance by Art of Time Ensemble, Toronto, Canada
 2015- Blue, Blue Elefante (Uruguay) - photographs for the book by Eulalia Bosch (Barcelona)
 2015- Cuatro horizontes (Four Horizons) - an account of the trip to Le Corbusier's Ronchamp chapel with John Berger, Sister Lucia Kuppens and Sister Telchilde Hinkley
 2016- 'Lapwing and Fox: conversations between John Berger and John Christie'' published by OBJECTIF, UK - This book records a recent exchange of letters and small books sent between the two friends over a three-year period (2011–14). Complementing their correspondence on the subject of colour, 'I Send You This Cadmium Red' published in 2000, 'Lapwing and Fox' covers a wide range of ideas and thoughts surrounding art and artists, drawing and painting, nature and place.
 2017- 'Seeing Through Drawing: A Celebration of John Berger' published by OBJECTIF, UK - This book is both a celebration of John Berger's love of drawing and a space where his friends and family remember and pay tribute to this remarkable writer and artist who died on 2 January 2017. Edited and with an Introduction by John Christie the book has contributions from Katya Berger Andreadakis, Yves Berger, Geoff Dyer, Anne Michaels, Tom Overton, Gareth Evans, Martin Battye and Paul Gordon. The book is also in part a catalogue for the exhibition 'Seeing Through Drawing' at Mandell's Gallery, Norwich (July/August 2017) which featured original drawings by John Berger plus work by over 30 artists to whom Berger's fiction and critical writings were important influences.  
 2017- 'Lapwing and Fox' voted 'Book of the Year' at the East Anglian Book Awards.

References

External links
 John Christie at Mandell's Gallery
 John Christie | University of Maryland Art Gallery
 Collaborations: in conversation with John Christie
 John Christie in conversation with Martin Battye
 http://www.newstatesman.com/culture/books/2016/11/why-john-berger-least-theoretical-marxist-earth
 http://theartnewspaper.com/comment/reviews/books/long-may-he-continue-on-john-berger-at-90/

1945 births
Living people
British filmmakers
British artists